Abdel Kader Rabieh (7 July 1958 – 13 July 2010) was an Egyptian basketball player. He competed in the men's tournament at the 1984 Summer Olympics.

References

1958 births
2010 deaths
Egyptian men's basketball players
Olympic basketball players of Egypt
Basketball players at the 1984 Summer Olympics
Place of birth missing